Józef Tadeusz Mamoń (23 February 1922 – 16 May 1979) was a Polish footballer who competed in the 1952 Summer Olympics.

References

1922 births
1979 deaths
Association football forwards
Footballers from Kraków
Poland international footballers
Polish footballers
Olympic footballers of Poland
Footballers at the 1952 Summer Olympics
Wisła Kraków players